Kosi River, also known as Koshi or Kaushiki, is a tributary of the Ramganga River. It is an important river in the Kumaon region of Uttarakhand. Kair and Shisham forests are found on the banks of the river.

Course 

The Kosi originates from the Dharapani Dhar near Kausani, and flows towards the south. Flowing through the towns of Someshwar and Almora, it reaches Khwarab, where it is joined by the Suyal river. From Khwarab, it begins to flow west, passing through Khairna, Garampani and Betalghat. After reaching Salt Patti, it flows in the north-west direction till Mohaan, from where it takes a sharp bend and starts flowing towards the south-east. After passing through Dhikuli, it descends into the plains at Ramnagar. After traveling  from Ramnagar, it enters the state of Uttar Pradesh at Sultanpur. It passes through the left of Rampur city and joins Ramganga near Chamraul village of Shahabad tehsil in Rampur district, Uttar Pradesh.

References

Notes

Bibliography
 
 
 

Rivers of Uttarakhand
Rivers of Uttar Pradesh